Dimitrios Itsios ( Dimítrios Ítsios; 5 April 1906 – 6 April 1941) was a Greek reservist non-commissioned officer of the Hellenic Army during the German invasion of Greece, in April 1941. He commanded a machine gun platoon, consisting of Pillboxes P7 and P8, inflicting heavy losses on the invaders. He was a sergeant, but after his death he received the honorary title of master sergeant from the Greek state.

Biography
He was born in the family of Efstathios Itsios in 1906, in the village of Ano Poroia in Central Macedonia, which was then still within the Ottoman Empire. The village was liberated by the Greek army after victories over the Turks and Bulgarians in the Balkan Wars (1912-1913), when Dimitrios was just 6 years old. The border with Bulgaria was established two dozen kilometers north of the village, along the ridge of Kerkini.

During the First World War, the village was once again occupied by the Bulgarians. After the defeat of Bulgaria and during the Greek-Bulgarian population exchange, the Bulgarian-speaking part of the population left the village.

Dimitrios Itsios was married to his fellow villager Anna K. Nanopoulou, with whom he had two children, Maria and Anastasios.

References

1906 births
1941 deaths
Greek military personnel killed in action
Greek military personnel killed in World War II
Recipients of the Cross of Valour (Greece)
People from Serres (regional unit)